Radio Paşcani is the first album by Romanian twelve-piece Roma brass band Fanfare Ciocărlia. AllMusic characterized it as "a type of ecstatic, hyper, adrenaline-fueled gypsy music sometimes affectionately referred to as speed brass".

The album was recorded 1997 at Studio Electrocord in Bucharest, Romania, and mixed at Schalloran Tonstudio in Berlin, Germany. Producers are Henry Ernst and Helmut Neumann. It was released 1998 by Piranha Musik.

Track listing 
 Radio Paşcani — 0:45
 Rusasca de la Buzdug — 1:19
 Sîrba de la Zece Prajini — 2:08
 Arâpeasca — 0:50
 Doina şi balaşeanca — 6:04
 Trio cu patru — 1:07
 Hora cu strîgaturii — 2:32
 Ciocărlia si Suite — 4:48
 Rusasca lui filon — 1:46
 Manea — 2:59
 Nicoleta — 3:53
 Foxtrot — 3:22
 Geamparale — 2:54
 Bulgareasca — 1:57
 Sîrba lui Sîcal — 2:38
 Bâtuta la rînd — 2:10
 Sîrba de la monastirea — 1:22
 Dansul lui Sulo — 1:22
 Lume, lume — 3:07
 Ah Ya Bibi — 1:58
 Hora de la Bucuresti — 1:44
 Devlesa — 0:35
 Rumba tziganeasca — 3:05

References

1998 albums
Fanfare Ciocărlia albums